The Team relay competition at the 2019 FIL World Luge Championships was held on 27 January 2019.

Results
The race was started at 16:00.

References

Team relay